Qiongocera is a genus of Southeast Asian araneomorph spiders in the family Psilodercidae, containing the single species, Qiongocera hongjunensis. It was  first described by F. Y. Li & S. Q. Li in 2017, and has only been found in China.

References

External links

Monotypic Araneomorphae genera
Psilodercidae